is a Japanese ice sledge hockey player. He was part of the Japanese sledge hockey team that won a silver medal at the 2010 Winter Paralympics.

He injured his spinal cord during a snowboarding accident when he was 21.

References

External links 
 

1978 births
Living people
Japanese sledge hockey players
Paralympic sledge hockey players of Japan
Paralympic silver medalists for Japan
Ice sledge hockey players at the 2002 Winter Paralympics
Ice sledge hockey players at the 2006 Winter Paralympics
Ice sledge hockey players at the 2010 Winter Paralympics
Para ice hockey players at the 2018 Winter Paralympics
Medalists at the 2010 Winter Paralympics
Sportspeople from Tokyo
People from Nishitōkyō, Tokyo
People with paraplegia
Paralympic medalists in sledge hockey
Chiba Institute of Technology alumni